= Stoppelsberg (Sinntal) =

Mountain in Hesse, Germany

Coordinates: 50°19′41″N 9°40′38″E

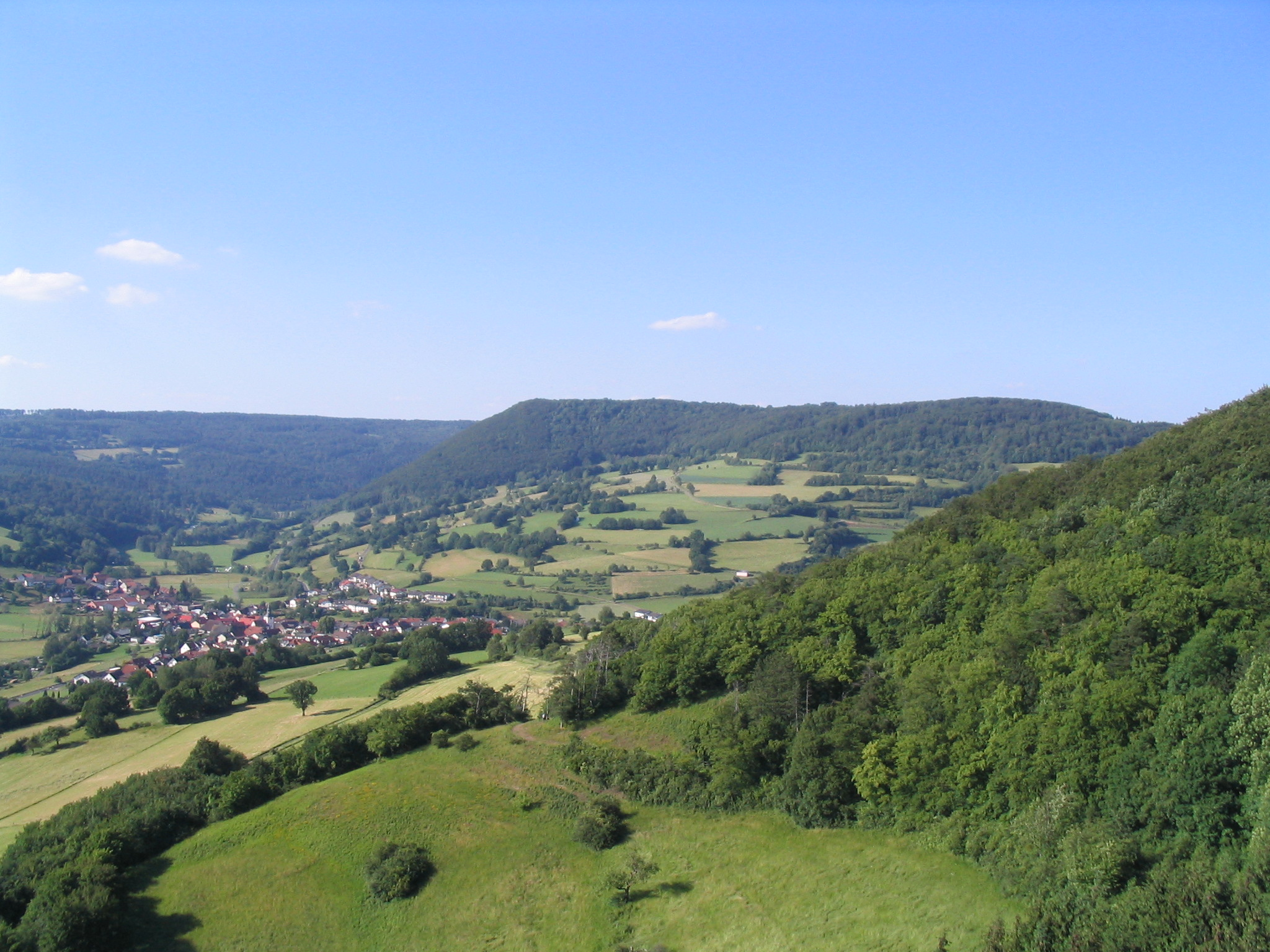
- The Stoppelsberg from the south, seen from Schwarzenfels Castle.

Highest point
- Elevation: 570.7 m (1,872 ft)

Geography
- Location: Hesse, Germany

The Stoppelsberg is a hill in Hesse, Germany.
